Andrew Patrick Vincent Siemion is an astrophysicist and director]of the Berkeley SETI Research Center. His research interests include high energy time-variable celestial phenomena, astronomical instrumentation and the search for extraterrestrial intelligence (SETI).  Andrew Siemion is the Principal Investigator for the Breakthrough Listen program.

Siemion received a B.A. degree in 2008, an M.A. degree in 2010, and a Ph.D. degree in 2012, all in astrophysics from the University of California, Berkeley. In 2018, Siemion was named the Bernard M. Oliver Chair for SETI at the SETI Institute. Siemion is jointly affiliated with Radboud University Nijmegen and the University of Malta. Also in 2018, he was elected to the International Academy of Astronautics as a Corresponding Member for Basic Sciences. In September 2015, Siemion testified on the current status of astrobiology to the House Committee on Science, Space, and Technology of the United States Congress.

Media appearances 
Siemion regularly appears on television, radio, and other media outlets discussing the search for extraterrestrial intelligence, astrobiology and astrophysics. He has appeared on Space's Deepest Secrets, Through the Wormhole, Horizon and Aliens: The Definitive Guide.

References

External links
 
 

Living people
21st-century  American astronomers
University of California, Berkeley faculty
1980 births